Neville Quist (born 1952) is an Australian fashion designer.

Biography
Neville Quist was born in 1952 in Glenelg, South Australia. He founded the clothing label Saville Row in 1973 in Adelaide, South Australia.

In 1989 Quist developed the first animated patterned men's socks. The label attached to these products was Johnny Dangerous and was sold throughout thirteen European countries. Pacific Dunlop entered into a licensing agreement with Quist, as did Bonds Underwear. Michael Jackson attempted to use the brand Dangerous on items of clothing for his Dangerous tour but was unsuccessful in doing so. Consequently, Jackson, through Triumph International, attempted to reach a resolution with Quist. The outcome of this is unknown.

Quist was nominated five times as Australia's Leading Menswear Fashion Designer at the Australian Fashion Awards from 1991 to 1996).

Quist collaborated with Elders in 2001 and became its international design consultant and developed Quist superfine knitwear, which specialises in Australian merino wool knitwear. Quist knitwear has been described as the "finest knitwear in the world".

Saville Row is stocked Australia-wide and internationally.

References

1952 births
Living people
People from South Australia
Australian fashion designers
Australian company founders
People educated at Sacred Heart College, Adelaide